Bauphal Upazila is an upazila of Patuakhali District in the Division of Barisal, Bangladesh.

Geography
The area of Bauphal is 486.91 km2 and it is located in between 22°19´ and 22°36´ north latitudes and in between 90°25´ and 90°40´ east longitudes.  It is bordered by Bakerganj and Bhola Sadar Upazila on the north, Dashmina and Galachipa Upazila on the south, Bhola Sadar, Burhanuddin and Lalmohan Upazila on the east and Patuakhali Sadar and Bakerganj Upazila on the west.

Tentulia and Lohalia are the main rivers.

Demographics
According to the 2007 Bangladesh census, Bauphal had a population of 304959, comprising 152,384 males and 152,575 females. Out of the population, 78,517 were Muslim, 26398 were Hindu, 17 were Buddhist and 27 followed other beliefs. The average literacy rate was 52.6%, comprising 56.5% among males and 48.8% among females.

Arts and culture

There have multicultural inhabitants and of different profession. Pottery is the most familiar industry of Bauphal, based on Kagujir Pool (a joint place of Paurashava and Madanpura Union).

Administration

Bauphal Thana was formed in 1874 and it was turned into an upazila in 1983.

Bauphal Upazila is divided into Bauphal Municipality and 14 union parishads: Adabaria, Bauphal, Boga, Das Para, Dhulia, Kachipara, Kalaiya, Kalishuri, Kanakdia, Keshabpur, Madanpura, Najirpur, Nawmala, and Shurjamoni. The union parishads are subdivided into 134 mauzas and 140 villages.

Bauphal Municipality is subdivided into 9 wards and 10 mahallas.

Educational institutes

There are a few educational institutions in Bauphal. Among them, 10 colleges, 1 polytechnic institute, 59 secondary schools, 122 primary schools, 72 madrasas.

Notable people
 ASM Feroz, the Member of Parliament (MP) for constituency Patuakhali-6 from 1979 to 1982, and Patuakhali-2 from 1986 to 1987 and from 1991 until 2001, has been MP for Patuakhali-2 again since 2009.
 KM Nurul Huda, Chief Election Commissioner of Bangladesh. 
   Abdul Malek, Information Commissioner of Bangladesh. 
 Abdul Aziz Khandaker, former member of parliament (Patuakhali -6) 
 Zobaydul Haq Rasel, Bangladeshi Politician
 Khandaker Shamsul Haq (Reza), Former General Secretary, Bangladesh Krishak League.

See also
Upazilas of Bangladesh
Districts of Bangladesh
Divisions of Bangladesh

References

Upazilas of Patuakhali District